The Internet country code top-level domain (ccTLD) .io is nominally assigned to the British Indian Ocean Territory. The domain is operated commercially by Afilias, a domain name registry subsidiary of Ethos Capital.

Google's ad targeting treats .io as a generic top-level domain (gTLD) because "users and webmasters frequently see [the domain] more generic than country-targeted".

History
The .io domain was delegated by the Internet Assigned Numbers Authority to British entrepreneur Paul Kane in 1997 together with the ccTLDs .ac (Ascension Island), .sh (St Helena), and .tm (Turkmenistan). Kane operated them for private benefit under the trade name "Internet Computer Bureau" from 1997 until 2017. In 2014, Kane claimed that "profits are distributed to the authorities for them to operate services as they see fit" and that "Each of the overseas territories has an account and the funds are deposited there because obviously the territories have expenses that they incur and it’s offsetting that." However the UK government has repeatedly stated that this is untrue: “There is no agreement between the UK Government and ICB regarding the administration of the .io domain” and "the Government receives no revenues from the sales or administration of this domain."
The first subdomain was registered under .IO in 1998, when Levi Strauss & Co. registered the domain levi.io.

In April, 2017, Paul Kane sold the Internet Computer Bureau holding company to privately-held domain name registry services provider Afilias for $70.17m in cash.

In December, 2020, Afilias' owner Hal Lubsen sold it to privately-held Donuts for an undisclosed sum. 

One month later, in January 2021, Donuts was acquired by private equity firm Ethos Capital, again for an undisclosed sum.

In 2021, the United Nations' International Tribunal for the Law of the Sea ruled that the United Kingdom has no sovereignty over the Chagos Archipelago, and that sovereignty instead belongs to Mauritius. This would extinguish the British Indian Ocean Territory, and the IO ISO-3166 two-letter country code and .io domain could also be extinguished. The United Kingdom, which was not a party to the case, disputes and does not recognise the tribunal's decision, so further legal processes are likely. In 2022, the Mauritian government was considering how to progress the issue.

In July 2021, the Chagos Refugees Group UK submitted a complaint to the Irish government against domain-name speculators Paul Kane and Ethos Capital subsidiary Afilias, seeking repatriation of the .IO ("Indian Ocean") country-code top-level domain and payment of back royalties from the $7m/year in revenue generated by the domain. While attempts to repatriate top-level domains are not uncommon, this one is notable in that it cites consumer and human rights violations of the OECD's 2011 Guidelines for Multinational Enterprises rather than multistakeholder representation under ICANN policy, and because the .io domain has enjoyed commercial success, particularly among cryptocurrency companies, with more than 270,000 domains registered.

Registration and restrictions
Individuals and organisations are allowed to register .io domains.

Labels for .io domains may only contain alphanumeric characters and hyphens, and must be between 3 and 63 characters long. Domain names cannot begin or end with a hyphen symbol, and may not contain two consecutive hyphens. The entire domain name may not contain more than 253 characters.

Applicants for the registration of .io domains do not need to be registered or established in the British Indian Ocean Territory. Third-level domains, such as "xyz.com.io", can only be registered by an inhabitant of the area. (Since there are no legal, permanent inhabitants of the British Indian Ocean Territory, theoretically no third-level domains will be registered.) Any second-level domains used by NIC.IO and top-level domains cannot be used as a third-level domain. For example, the domains "com.com.io", "org.com.io", and "biz.com.io" are all restricted.

Domain names in .io may not be used, "for any purpose that is sexual or pornographic or that is against the statutory laws of any nation." If this requirement is breached, "NIC.IO reserves the right to immediately deactivate the offending registration."

.io domains may be registered for a minimum of one year, and a maximum of 5 years.

Domain names in .io are priced higher than those in many other TLDs. Registering an available .io-domain currently costs US$90 per year.

Usage
The .io domain is used almost exclusively for purposes unrelated to the British Indian Ocean Territory.

In computer science, "IO" or "I/O" is commonly used as an abbreviation for input/output, which makes the .io domain desirable for services that want to be associated with technology. .io domains are often used for open source projects, application programming interfaces ("APIs"), startup companies, browser games, and other online services.

The TLD is also used for domain hacks, as the letters "io" are an ending of many English terms. For example, Rub.io is a shortened URL that was used for the 2016 U.S. presidential campaign of Marco Rubio.

One reason given for the TLD's popularity is that it stands out by being shorter than other TLDs. Also, the .io TLD is less occupied than other TLDs, so it is more likely that a given term is available there.

In Esperanto, io as an independent word is the assertive existential indefinite pronoun (English "something"). As a suffix, -io is used to terminate official names of countries or other kind of lands under which a community of people are grouped. The Plena Ilustrita Vortaro de Esperanto includes almost 500 such terms, from Abisenio (Abyssinia, modern-day Ethiopia) to Zambio (Zambia). Derived from that, the suffix is also used to designate a community of people whose common interest is indicated by the suffixed root, especially in the term Esperantio, the community of speakers of the language and their culture as a whole, as well as the places and institutions where the language is used. As of May 2020, the esperant.io domain name redirects to Libera Folio, an independent generalist online bulletin written in Esperanto.

.io games
Around 2015 a multiplayer game, Agar.io, spawned many other games with a similar playstyle that used the .io domain, such as Diep.io, Slither.io, Surviv.io, and ZombsRoyale.io. Such games are collectively called ".io games".

Controversy
According to a 2014 Gigaom interview with Paul Kane, then chairman of the Internet Computer Bureau, the domain name registry is required to give some of its profits to the British government, for administration of the British Indian Ocean Territory. After being questioned as a result of the interview, the British Government denied receiving any funds from the sale of .io domain names, and argued that consequently, the profits could not be shared with the Chagossians, the former inhabitants forcibly removed by the British government. Kane, however, contradicted the government's denial.

References

External links

IANA .io whois information
NIC.IO

Country code top-level domains
Council of European National Top Level Domain Registries members
Communications in the British Indian Ocean Territory
Computer-related introductions in 1997
sv:Toppdomän#I